Clifford Lynwood "Clay" Athey Jr. (born September 1, 1960) is an American politician and jurist. He served as a member of the Virginia House of Delegates from 2002 to 2012. He has served as a judge of the Virginia Court of Appeals since 2019.

Service in the Virginia House of Delegates
He is a former Republican member of the Virginia House of Delegates 2002–2011. During his 10 years in the House of Delegates, he represented the 18th district, made up of Warren County and parts of Fauquier and Frederick Counties.

State court service
In 2012, Governor Bob McDonnell appointed him a judge of the 26th Judicial Circuit, covering Clarke, Frederick, Page, Rockingham, Shenandoah and Warren counties and the cities of Harrisonburg and Winchester in the northern part of the state.

Appointment to Virginia Court of Appeals

On February 16, 2019, he was appointed by the Virginia General Assembly for a seat on the Virginia Court of Appeals vacated by Teresa M. Chafin, who was appointed to the Virginia Supreme Court.

Notes

External links

1960 births
Living people
Members of the Virginia House of Delegates
Virginia Republicans
Virginia lawyers
Virginia Commonwealth University alumni
University of Dayton alumni
People from Front Royal, Virginia
21st-century American politicians
Virginia state court judges
Judges of the Court of Appeals of Virginia